Catharina Glassér-Bjerner (born 16 February 1964 in Grycksbo) is a Swedish former alpine skier who competed in the 1988 Winter Olympics.

External links
 sports-reference.com
 

1964 births
Living people
Swedish female alpine skiers
Olympic alpine skiers of Sweden
Alpine skiers at the 1988 Winter Olympics
People from Falun Municipality
Sportspeople from Dalarna County
20th-century Swedish women